Dr. Mahendra Singh Pal is an Indian politician.  He represented the Nainital Lok Sabha constituency from 1989 to 1991, and again from 2002 to 2004.  Pal is a member of the Indian National Congress (INC) party and served on the Committee on Urban and Rural Development in 2003.
He was designated a Senior Advocate in 2004.  He is a leading advocate and practices mainly in the High Court of Uttarakhand at Nainital . He was ex Additional Advocate General of Uttarakhand High Court in Supreme Court.

He was also President of the Uttarakhand Bar Council and High Court Bar Association of Uttarakhand several times and a legal advisor to the Soldier Board in Haldwani.

Personal life
Dr.Mahendra Singh Pal married Lt. Col Meena Shah on 9 May 1987. He belongs to erstwhile royal family of Askote in District Pithoragarh.
He is the second eldest among four brothers and a sister born to second world war veteran Subedar Dev Shamsher Singh Pal and Shrimati Sona Devi.

Positions held

Sources
Lok Sabha

Lok Sabha members from Uttarakhand
India MPs 1989–1991
India MPs 1999–2004
Indian National Congress politicians from Uttar Pradesh
Politicians from Allahabad
1949 births
Living people
Uttar Pradesh politicians
Janata Dal politicians